The O'Day 26 is an American trailerable sailboat that was designed by C. Raymond Hunt and Associates as a cruiser and first built in 1983.

Production
The design was built by O'Day Corp. in the United States between 1983 and 1985, with 85 boats completed, but it is now out of production.

Design
The O'Day 26 is a recreational keelboat, built predominantly of fiberglass, with wood trim. It has a masthead sloop rig, a raked stem, a reverse transom, a transom-hung rudder controlled by a tiller and a fixed stub keel with a retractable centerboard. It displaces  and carries  of ballast.

The boat is normally fitted with a small  outboard motor or inboard for docking and maneuvering, with a maximum of  recommended.

The design has sleeping accommodation for five people, with a double "V"-berth in the bow cabin, two straight settee berths in the main cabin and a single berth under the cockpit. The galley is located on the starboard side at the companionway ladder. The galley is "L"-shaped and is equipped with a two-burner stove, ice box and a sink. The head is located just aft of the bow cabin.

Operational history
In a 2010 review Steve Henkel wrote, "the O'Day 26 resembles her near-sistership, the O'Day 25 ... to an extent that makes it difficult to distinguish one from the other. Both give buyers a choice of inboard or outboard power. The cabin and cockpit layouts on both are almost identical, and feature the same 5' 6" headroom. The waterline on the '26' is eleven inches longer than on the '25' ... according to O’Day, the design basis behind the O'Day 26 was 'to maximize the idea of a boat suitable for coastwise ocean sailing and over-the-road transport by a pleasure vehicle without any special size permits.' The result, O'Day says, is a boat that 'has the right stuff for easy trailer sailing.' We wonder about that, in view of the 6,900 lbs. trailering weight, requiring a specially equipped SUV with extra engine power. A 2008 Ford E-250 van  with 4.6 liter V8 won't do it, but add a 5.4 liter engine and it will. Is that still considered a 'pleasure vehicle'? Best features: The O'Day 26 probably has a little more speed than her comp[etitor]s. Worst features: None noticed."

See also
List of sailing boat types

References

External links
Video - O'Day 26 Walk-through
Original 1984 company O'Day 26 advertisement

Keelboats
1980s sailboat type designs
Sailing yachts
Trailer sailers
Sailboat type designs by C. Raymond Hunt Associates
Sailboat types built by O'Day Corp.